Celticisation, or Celticization, was historically the process of conquering and assimilating by the ancient Celts. Today, as the Celtic inhabited-areas significantly differ, the term still refers to making something Celtic, usually focusing around the Celtic nations and their languages.

Ancient history

During the 1st millennium BC, the early Celts expanded from a core territory in Atlantic Europe to Iberia, the British Isles and later also the Balkans and Central Europe, and are assumed to have "Celticized" (Pre-Celtic) earlier populations such as Illyrians and Thracians in the Balkans and Basques elsewhere.

Illyria and Pannonia

The Celticization in Pannonia  began as early as the 4th century BCE. La Tene type finds are characteristic in Pre-Roman Pannonia and are considered a marker to variations in the degree of Celticization. Among the Illyrian tribes some were Celticized to varying degrees (some completely) like the Pannoni and the Dalmatae. A type of wooden oblong shield with an iron boss was introduced to Illyria from the Celts. Illyrian chiefs and kings wore bronze torcs around their necks much as the Celts did.

The Celts had two settlements that later became cities in Illyria, namely Navissos and Segestica. In Thrace they had Serdica (modern Sofia, Bulgaria), Tylis, founded by Gauls, Dunonia, Singidunum and Taurunum.

Many Celtic tribes or parts of Celtic tribes migrated to Illyria, Thrace and Dacia.

The gradual Celticization of all of Pannonia took place in the 3rd century BCE. Names became Celtic, as seen in Roman times, and Celts had established control north of the Sava and south and west of the Danube. In the western half and west of Pannonia the Pre-Celtic language disappeared. By the first half of the 1st century BCE the language of the Illyrians in Northern Dalmatia was completely Celticized. There is an abundance of Celtic names in Illyria sometimes making the Illyrian ones seem few. Those parts of Pannonia that had not been conquered by the first Celtic invasion were already Celticized by the  beginning of the 3rd century BCE. The Dalmatae had been Celticized by the 3rd century BCE. In the region of Pannonia as a Roman province Celticization had almost completely eradicated Illyrian culture.

Alps and Italy

In the Alpine region as a whole, there is evidence that the non-Celtic elements had, by the time of Augustus, been assimilated by the influx of Celtic tribes and had adopted Celtic speech. According to Livy, the "sound" of the Raeti's original tongue (sonum linguae) had become corrupted as a result of inhabiting the Alps. This may indicate that at least some of the tribes lost their ancestral Raetic tongue to Celtic. Celticisation also finds support in the Roman practice of twinning the Raeti with their neighbours to the North, the Vindelici, who are regarded by most historians to have been Celtic-speakers.

By the 4th century BCE the Veneti had been so Celticized that Polybius wrote that the Veneti of the 2nd century BCE were identical to the Celts except for language. The Greek historian Strabo (64 BCE–24 CE), on the other hand, conjectured that the Adriatic Veneti were descendant from Celts who in turn were related to later Celtic tribe of the same name who lived on the Belgian coast and fought against Julius Caesar.

Contemporary usage

Languages
In the modern era, there are attempts made to reverse the effects of centuries of Anglicisation and other assimilations and re-introduce Celtic languages. Most particularly in Wales, the Welsh language has seen a halt in its decline and even signs of revival, with approximately half a million fluent speakers. There have also been recent attempts to revive the Cornish language, and there are now several schools in Cornwall teaching in Cornish. The Breton language remains endangered as the number of its speakers continues to decline.

Gaelicisation is a sub-branch of celticisation, derived from Gaels, referring to modern-day Scotland, Ireland and Isle of Man.

See also
Pre-Celtic
Goidelic substrate hypothesis

References

Further reading
 Pope, Rachel. "Re-approaching Celts: Origins, Society, and Social Change". Journal of Archaeological Research (2021). https://doi.org/10.1007/s10814-021-09157-1

Cultural assimilation
Celtic studies
Celts